Savarin may refer to:
 Savarin cake, a kind of rum baba
 Charles Savarin (born 1943), a politician from Dominica
 Jean Anthelme Brillat-Savarin (1755–1826), a French lawyer, politician, epicure and gastronome
 Brillat-Savarin cheese, from Burgundy. 
 Julian Jay Savarin, a British musician, songwriter, poet and science fiction author
 Red Savarin, protagonist of Solatorobo: Red the Hunter
 A brand of coffee